Edward Welsh (January 3, 1843 – February 1, 1929) was a Union Army soldier during the American Civil War. He received the Medal of Honor for gallantry during the Siege of Vicksburg on May 22, 1863. His surname is sometimes spelled Welch.

Union assault

On May 22, 1863, General Ulysses S. Grant ordered an assault on the Confederate heights at Vicksburg, Mississippi. The plan called for a storming party of volunteers to build a bridge across a moat and plant scaling ladders against the enemy embankment in advance of the main attack.
The volunteers knew the odds were against survival and the mission was called, in nineteenth century vernacular, a "forlorn hope". Only single men were accepted as volunteers and even then, twice as many men as needed came forward and were turned away. The assault began in the early morning following a naval bombardment.
The Union soldiers came under enemy fire immediately and were pinned down in the ditch they were to cross. Despite repeated attacks by the main Union body, the men of the forlorn hope were unable to retreat until nightfall. Of the 150 men in the storming party, nearly half were killed.  Seventy-nine of the survivors were awarded the Medal of Honor.

Welsh was married to Katharine Burke Welsh.  He died in Washington, D.C., on February 1, 1929. He was interred at Mount Olivet Cemetery in Washington, D.C.

See also

List of Medal of Honor recipients
List of American Civil War Medal of Honor recipients: T–Z

References

1843 births
1929 deaths
19th-century Irish people
Irish soldiers in the United States Army
Union Army officers
United States Army Medal of Honor recipients
People of Ohio in the American Civil War
Irish-born Medal of Honor recipients
Irish emigrants to the United States (before 1923)
Burials at Mount Olivet Cemetery (Washington, D.C.)
American Civil War recipients of the Medal of Honor